Rivan Nurmulki (born 16 July 1995) is an Indonesian volleyball player. He is a member of the Indonesia men's national volleyball team.

Personal life 
Rivan was born in Jambi on July 16, 1995. He started playing volleyball at the age of 17. In 2013 he joined his first professional volleyball club Surabaya Samator.

In 2020, Rivan married to Aprilia Indah Puspitasari. They have one daughter together.

Career 
Rivan has played for Surabaya Samator with jersey number 12 since 2013. In 2019, he had played with a Thai club Nakhon Ratchasima The Mall.

In 2020, he played with V.League Division 1 club VC Nagano Tridents.

He joined the national team in 2015, he has participated in 2017 Asian Volleyball Championship, 2018 Asian Games.

Clubs 
  Surabaya Samator (2013–2016)
  Surabaya Bhayangkara Samator (2017–2019)
  Nakhon Ratchasima The Mall (2019)
  VC Nagano Tridents (2020–2022)
  Surabaya BIN Samator (2023–)

Awards

Individual awards 
 2016 Indonesian men's Proliga – "Most Valuable Player"
 2016 Indonesian men's Proliga – "Best Spiker"
 2017Asian Volleyball Championship – "Best Opposite Spiker"
 2018 Indonesian men's Proliga – "Most Valuable Player"
 2018 LienVietPostBank Cup – "Most Valuable Player"
 2019 Thai-Denmark Super League – "Most Valuable Player"

Clubs 
 2014 Indonesian men's Proliga –  Champion, with Surabaya Samator
 2015 Indonesian men's Proliga –  Runner-Up, with Surabaya Samator
 2016 Indonesian men's Proliga –  Champion, with Surabaya Samator
 2018 Indonesian men's Proliga –  Champion, with Surabaya Bhayangkara Samator
 2019 Indonesian men's Proliga –  Champion, with Surabaya Bhayangkara Samator
 2019 Thai-Denmark Super League –  Champion, with Nakhon Ratchasima The Mall

References

External links 
 Player profile at Volleybox.net

1995 births
Living people
Southeast Asian Games medalists in volleyball
Competitors at the 2015 Southeast Asian Games
Competitors at the 2017 Southeast Asian Games
Volleyball players at the 2018 Asian Games
Competitors at the 2019 Southeast Asian Games
Competitors at the 2021 Southeast Asian Games
Opposite hitters